Guitar Legends was a concert held over five nights, from October 15 to October 19, 1991, in Seville, Spain, with the aim of positioning the city as an entertainment destination to draw support for Expo '92 beginning the following April.

The show 

The event featured 27 top guitarists, including Brian May, BB King,  George Benson, Joe Walsh, Keith Richards, Les Paul, Robbie Robertson, Robert Cray, Roger Waters, Albert Collins, Steve Vai  and Joe Satriani. The vocalists included Rickie Lee Jones, Bob Dylan and Joe Cocker.

The event was conceived by British impresario and producer Tony Hollingsworth who originally agreed to stage the concert as a co-production deal with Spanish state television RTVE.  But RTVE dropped out on the day the contract was due to be signed when the director-general (and film director) Pilar Miro Romero left the company.

Later, the organisers of Expo '92 took on the project to help overcome the problem that Seville was being seen merely as a civil engineering project. They provided half the $7.2 million budget, with Hollingsworth raising the rest from television pre-sales. RTVE bought the Spanish rights, but paid by providing television and radio airtime for advertising slots. These were then sold to Coca-Cola.

Five 90-minute shows and a one-hour documentary were broadcast.  Forty-five countries showed at least one live show.  Later, broadcasters in 105 countries broadcast one or more programmes.

Rights in the event are held by Tribute Inspirations Limited.

Artists appearing at Guitar Legends

Guitarists 
 Albert Collins
 B.B. King
 Bo Diddley
 Brian May
 Dave Edmunds
 George Benson
 Joe Walsh
 Joe Satriani
 John McLaughlin
 Keith Richards
 Larry Coryell
 Les Paul
 Nuno Bettencourt
 Paco De Lucia
 Phil Manzanera
 Richard Thompson
 Robbie Robertson
 Robert Cray
 Roger Waters
 Roger McGuinn
 Steve Cropper
 Steve Vai
 Vicente Amigo

Vocalists 
 Bob Dylan
 Gary Cherone
 Joe Cocker
 Miguel Bosé
 Paul Rodgers
 Rickie Lee Jones

Backing musicians 
 Andy Fairweather-Low
 Bill Dillon
 Billy Nicholls
 Bo Dollis
 Brandon Fields
 Bryan Simpson
 Charley Drayton
 China Gordon
 Chris Thompson
 Chris Stainton
 Chuck Leavell
 Cleveland Watkiss
 Cozy Powell
 David Hull
 Debby Hastings
 Dennis Chambers
 Deric Dyer
 Dominique Di Piazza
 Doreen Chanter
 Everette Harp
 Gary Mazaroppi
 George Bohanon
 George Duke
 Graham Broad
 Ivan Neville
 Jack Bruce

 John Miles

 John Leftwich
 John David
 Katie Kissoon
 Kevin Dillon
 Larry Kimpel
 Louis Orapollo
 Maggie Ryder
 Manu Katche
 Miami Horns
 Mike Moran
 Miriam Stockley
 Monk Boudreaux
 Nathan East
 Neil Murray
 Pat Leonard
 Peter Wood
 Pino Palladino
 Ray Cooper
 Ray Brown
 Richard Cousins
 Rick Wakeman
 Robert Smith
 Sal Demandi
 Simon Phillips
 Snowy White

 Stanley Clarke

 Steve Jordan

 Steve Ferrone
 Terry Williams
 Tony Levin
 Trilok Gurtu

References

Rock concerts
1991 concerts
1991 in Spanish music
History of Seville